Pseudotheraptus is a genus of true bugs belonging to the family Coreidae.

The species of this genus are found in Africa.

Species:

Pseudotheraptus devastans 
Pseudotheraptus ugandae 
Pseudotheraptus wayi

References

Coreidae